Clarinbridge is a village in south County Galway, Ireland. It is on the mouth of the Clarin River at the end of Dunbulcaun Bay, which is the easternmost part of Galway Bay.

The placename is also spelled Clarenbridge.

Notable people
Alexander Young, recipient of the Victoria Cross

See also
Galway International Oyster Festival

References

External links
Clarenbridge Oyster Festival
Clarinbridge GAA

Towns and villages in County Galway